The 2013–14 Metal Ligaen season was the 57th season of ice hockey in Denmark. Nine teams participated in the league. SønderjyskE Ishockey defended their 2013 Danish championship title by defeating Herning Blue Fox four games to three in the finals.

Regular season

Playoffs

External links
 Metal Ligaen official website

Dan
2013 in Danish sport
2014 in Danish sport